Phil Lee Rollins (January 19, 1934 – February 8, 2021) was an American professional basketball player.

Biography
Rollins was selected in the 1956 NBA draft by the Philadelphia Warriors after a collegiate career at Louisville. As a senior in 1955–56 he helped lead the Cardinals to a National Invitation Tournament championship.

In Rollins' five-year professional career, most of which was spent in the National Basketball Association (NBA) (his final season was in the American Basketball League), he played for five different teams. In NBA games only, Rollins averaged 5.1 points, 2.3 rebounds and 2.6 assists per game.

His brother, Ken, starred at the University of Kentucky before starting a professional basketball career.  Ken was also a member of the 1948 NCAA and Olympic Gold Medal teams.

He died on February 8, 2021, twenty days after his 87th birthday.

References

External links

1934 births
2021 deaths
American men's basketball players
Basketball players from Kentucky
Cincinnati Royals players
Louisville Cardinals men's basketball players
New York Knicks players
People from Ballard County, Kentucky
Philadelphia Warriors draft picks
Philadelphia Warriors players
Pittsburgh Rens players
Point guards
Shooting guards
St. Louis Hawks players